Nicole Elise Beck  (born 28 May 1988) is a female Australian rugby union player who plays as a wing for Australia, Sydney and Sydney University. She won a gold medal at the 2016 Summer Olympics in Rio.

Life
A former Australian touch football representative, Beck was selected by Wallaroos coach Steve Hamson after just two games of 15-a-side rugby and made her international debut in the test match lost 36–3 to the Black Ferns on 14 October 2008 at Viking Park in Canberra. Only a few months before, Beck had been chosen to play with Australia Women's Sevens for the 2009 World Cup qualifiers scheduled on 25–26 July 2008 at Apia Park in Samoa. She scored a decisive try on full-time in the 22–15 win against New Zealand, claiming the Oceania Sevens champions title.

The following year, Australia won the Rugby World Cup Sevens defeating 15-10 New Zealand in a final started with a try by Beck in the second minute and ended in extra-time with a golden point strike by Shelly Matcham.

Beck played an important role in Australia's third place at the 2010 Women's Rugby World Cup, scoring 1 try, 11 conversions and 1 penalty, becoming one of the nominees for the 2010 IRB Women's Personality of the Year and pulling off a great try-saving tackle on Fiona Pocock during the semi-final against England. She was a member of Australia's team at the 2016 Olympics, defeating New Zealand in the final to win the inaugural Olympic gold medal in the sport.

Beck currently studies a Bachelor of Educational Studies at Charles Sturt University.

At the 2017 Australia Day Honours she received the Medal of the Order of Australia for service to sport as a gold medallist at the Rio 2016 Olympic Games.

References

External links
 Wallaroos Profile
 
 
 

1988 births
Living people
Australia women's international rugby union players
Australian female rugby sevens players
Australian female rugby union players
Medalists at the 2016 Summer Olympics
Olympic gold medalists for Australia
Olympic medalists in rugby sevens
Olympic rugby sevens players of Australia
Recipients of the Medal of the Order of Australia
Rugby sevens players at the 2016 Summer Olympics
Rugby union players from Wollongong
Rugby union wings
Touch footballers
University of Wollongong alumni
Australia international rugby sevens players